is a park in the Musashino región of the Japanese metropolis of Tokyo.

Location
The park is located in the border area of the cities of Mitaka, Fuchū and Chōfu next to Chōfu Airport and close to Musashino Forest Sport Plaza and Ajinomoto Stadium.

The park is a wooded area, with sports facilities and two areas for parking cars. It is administered by the Tokyo Metropolitan Park Association (東京 都 公園 協会).

Inauguration
The park was opened on April 1, 2000, and is surrounded by the "Musashino Forest".

As part of the 2020 Summer Olympics, the start of men's and women's road races in cycling took place in Musashinonomori Park.

References

External links 

Parks and gardens in Tokyo
Venues of the 2020 Summer Olympics